The Esteghlal Cup was an association football competition run by the Yemen Football Association (YFA). It was played between 2006 until 2008

Finals

External links 
 Esteghlal Cup results RSSSF

 

Defunct football cup competitions in Yemen